Hibiscus is a genus of flowering plants.

Hibiscus may also refer to:

Places
 Hibiscus Apartments
 Hibiscus Coast
 Hibiscus Island
 Hibiscus Park, a public housing estate in Kwai Chung, Hong Kong

Ships
 HMS Hibiscus, two vessels of the British Royal Navy
 USS Hibiscus (1864), a United States Navy ship

Other uses
 Hibiscus (entertainer) (1949–1982), American actor
 Hibiscus, a 2005 album by Stonefree
 Hibiscus (restaurant), a restaurant in England
 Hibiscus tea, tea made from the flowers of hibiscus sabdariffa